Lau Pa Sat , also known as Telok Ayer Market, is a historic building located within the Downtown Core in the Central Area of Singapore. It was first built in 1824 as a fish market on the waterfront serving the people of early colonial Singapore and rebuilt in 1838. It was then relocated and rebuilt at the present location in 1894. It is currently a food court with stalls selling a variety of local cuisine.

The market remains one of the oldest Victorian structures in South-East Asia and one of the first structures built in pre-fabricated cast iron in Asia. It is also the only remaining market left that served the residents in the central district of early Singapore.

Etymology
Telok Ayer Market is named after Telok Ayer Bay. In the early nineteenth century, the market was a simple wooden building located on piles just over the waters of Telok Ayer Bay before land reclamation work filled in the bay. The Malay name Telok Ayer means "bay water", and the then coastal road Telok Ayer Street was located alongside the bay before land reclamation work started in 1879.

Lau Pa Sat means "old market" in the vernacular Hokkien Chinese of Singapore. Lau (老) means old; pa sat is the Hokkien pronunciation of the Persian loanword "bazaar" (market) which is pasar in Malay. The original Telok Ayer market was one of the oldest markets in Singapore; a new market called Ellenborough Market was later built along Ellenborough Street (now the site of The Central shopping mall, next to Tew Chew Street), and that market became known to the locals as the "new market" (Pasar Baru or Sin Pa Sat, Ellenborough Street was known as Sin Pa Sat Kham meaning "the mouth of the new market"), while the Telok Ayer Market in turn became known colloquially as the "old market" or Lau Pa Sat.  Because of its Victorian iron structure, the market is also referred to in Malay as pasar besi (market of iron).

History

The first market built in Singapore, a fish market, was located on the south bank of the Singapore River near the north end of the Market Street.  On 4 November 1822, as part of his general plan to remodel the town, Stamford Raffles issued an instruction to relocate the fish market to Telok Ayer.

The construction of the Telok Ayer Market started in 1823 under the supervision of police officer Francis James Bernard at a site on the southern end of Market Street on Telok Ayer Bay. The market, a timber-and-atap structure, opened in 1824. It was built on the shore with part of its structure extended out to the sea, so waste from the market may be washed away by the tides and produce can be loaded or unloaded directly from boats via jetties. However, the building was not well-constructed – the timber piles on which the building was placed were not sturdy enough, and needed to be replaced soon after completion. Its atap roof also did not comply with building regulations and was therefore replaced with tiles. However, the structure was not strong enough to support a tile roof and was in danger of collapse, and it had to be replaced with atap again in 1827 regardless of fire regulation. The building was repeatedly repaired but by 1830, the structure was judged to be in an "extremely unsafe state" and needed to be rebuilt.  A temporary market was erected in 1832 while a newer building awaited construction.

The construction of a new market, designed by architect George Drumgoole Coleman, commenced on the same site in 1836 and it was completed in 1838. Coleman produced an octagonal building with ornamental columns at the entrance. The building had twice the area of the older market, and was formed of an outer and inner drum, with the colonnade of the outer drum letting in light but also providing shelter from the sun and rain. This building was built on two octagonal rings of brick piers, which supported a structure 125 feet in diameter, and an inner drum 40 feet in diameter. As with the previous structure, it suffered from its exposure to the monsoons and the sea, and soon after its construction, concerns over its safety were voiced, and the market needed to be repaired. In 1841, the market was extended on one side of the main building under the supervision of contractor Denis McSwiney with the erection of a new fish market. This new structure was a long open shed, and it was later further extended to run roughly parallel to two sides of the octagonal market. The extension would help protect the main market by serving as a breakwater to reduce the force of the swells and surf from the east. Despite concerns over its safety for many years, it stood for over 40 years until it was demolished when land was reclaimed on Telok Ayer Bay. The prominence of the market on the waterfront made the building a landmark of early Singapore.

Relocation

In 1879, land reclamation work on Telok Ayer Bay to create the land on which Robinson Road is now located began.  The newly reclaimed land, on which the current market now sits, was declared to be ready for use in 1890, and construction of a new market was initiated.  The market was certified as completed on 1 March 1894, and Market Street was extended to the new location. The new building, which covers an area of 55,000 square feet, was designed by the Municipal Engineer James MacRitchie (who also designed the MacRitchie Reservoir). MacRitchie adopted the octagonal shape of Coleman's original design, and used cast-iron pillars to support the building.  The cast-iron work cost £13,200, and was shipped out from Glasgow by P&W MacLellan, who had also supplied the iron for the Cavenagh Bridge in 1868. The great cast-iron columns which support the structure bear the maker's mark of W. MacFarlane and Co., also of Glasgow. The iron structure was erected by Riley Hargreaves & Co. (now United Engineers) at a cost of $14,900, while building contractor Chea Keow laid the foundation for $18,000. This building, which is the current one still standing, was placed close to the waterfront and served as a general market, but linked by a bridge to a fish market built over the sea. However, further land reclamations in the 20th century meant that the octagonal building is now some distance from the shoreline. 

A cast-iron fountain was originally placed at the centre of the market under the clock tower, but in 1902 the fountain was moved to the front of the now demolished Orchard Road Market. The fountain was moved again in 1930 to the Grand Hotel in Katong, and later dismantled and forgotten. It was rediscovered in pieces in 1989 by a team responsible for the restoration works for Raffles Hotel. The fountain has since been reassembled and restored, and now forms the centrepiece of the Palm Garden at the Raffles Hotel.

As food court 
By the early 1970s, the area around Telok Ayer Market—Shenton Way, Robinson Road, Cecil Street and Raffles Place—had transformed into a major commercial and financial district of Singapore, and a wet market was no longer considered suitable for the area. In 1972, the market was converted into a hawker centre. However, the historical and architectural value of Telok Ayer Marker was recognised, and it was gazetted as a national monument on 28 June 1973.

In 1986, the market was closed to allow construction of a new Mass Rapid Transit (MRT) line which runs underneath the building. The building was taken apart and its cast-iron supports put into storage in Jurong. Once the track-laying project has finished, the Telok Ayer Market was reconstructed in the late 1980s.

In 1989, the market was officially renamed Lau Pa Sat, the vernacular name most Singaporeans used to refer to the market. The old market reopened in 1991 as a festival market, a  modern food court and entertainment centre catering to office workers and tourists. The owner was the Jumabhoy family's Renaissance Property (part of Scotts Holding Ltd, which was acquired by what is now Capitaland). The grandiose food court was opened with a lot of fanfare and wide media publicity, with several innovations, including a performing stage brought back street eating, reminiscent of the old Orchard Road carpark. This required a complete re-design of old Singapore push-carts, incorporating modern sanitary standards. It also required cooperation between the developer and various government authorities in order to close the street each evening to traffic. Renaissance Properties also installed a chiming clock, imported from Switzerland, which continues to operate today, reminiscent of an earlier era. Unfortunately due to economic conditions, financial returns could not be realised. In addition, poor ventilation became a problem (no air conditioning) and affected higher end dining. Lau Pa Sat was later taken over in 1995 by Kopitiam, another food court operator, which changed the concept to become a large hawker centre. However, they retained the Jumabhoy's original idea of the food carts taking over the street alongside the market each evening.

A major renovation of Lau Pa Sat, costing $4 million and lasting 9 months, began on 1 September 2013. The layout of the stalls was reconfigured in the renovation, reducing the number of stalls but increasing the seating. Better ventilation with eight industrial ceiling fans was also installed. It reopened on 30 June 2014.

The market is the only remaining one left that served the resident in the central district in early Singapore.  The other four being the Orchard Road Market, Rochor Market, Clyde Terrace Market popularly known as Beach Road, demolished in 1983 to make way for now currently Gateway Building and Ellenborough Market, nicknamed Teochew Market where the surrounding area was populated by Teochews, near the New Bridge Road.

Lau Pa Sat underwent a minor renovation in 2020. In November 2020, part of Lau Pa Sat opened partially for a new food hall – Food Folks sized around 7,000 sq ft – Singapore's first locally-focused F&B and retail blended space. The rest of Lau Pa Sat reopened in 2021.

Architecture
 
Lau Pa Sat's octagonal, cast-iron structure was designed by James MacRitchie, who adopted George Drumgoole Coleman's original octagonal shape for the older market. The cast-iron structures were crafted by Walter MacFarlane & Company, an iron foundry in Glasgow, Scotland. These were then shipped over to Singapore, and assembled on its current location by Riley Hargreaves & Co.

A lantern is placed at the center, allowing daylight to illuminate the interior. The lantern is topped by a clock tower installed in 1991, and there is a set of a Carillon producing Chinese, Malay and Indian melodies. The 23 Dutch bronze bells are struck by a jacquemart (figure of a bell striker) dress like a coolie.

Images
The photographs of the renovated Lau Pa Sat are below.

References

Norman Edwards, Peter Keys (1996), Singapore - A Guide to Buildings, Streets, Places, Times Books International,

Further reading
 Lee Kip Lin (1983) Telok Ayer Market : a historical account of the market from the founding of the settlement of Singapore to the present time., Singapore, Archives & Oral History Department

External links

360° X 360° virtual reality tour of the Telok Ayer Market
Telok Ayer Market – The historic hawker centre in downtown Singapore

Commercial buildings completed in 1894
Downtown Core (Singapore)
Hawker centres in Singapore
Telok Ayer Market
19th-century architecture in Singapore